Brenner is a surname. Notable people with the surname include:

 Adam Brenner, better known under his stage name Adam Bomb (born 1963), American musician
 Albert Brenner (1926–2022), American art director
 Al Brenner (born 1947), American football player
 Andrew Brenner (born 1971), U.S. Republican party politician and member of the Ohio Senate
 Art Brenner (1924–2013), American artist
 Athalya Brenner (born 1943), Dutch-Israeli biblical scholar
 Barbara Brenner (1951–2013), American activist
 Benjamin Brenner (1903–1970), New York politician and judge
 Bert Brenner (1887–1971), American baseball player
 Bror Brenner (1885–1923), Finnish sailor
 Charles Brenner (biochemist), American biologist
 Charles Brenner (mathematician), American APL implementor and forensic mathematics
 Charles Brenner (psychiatrist) (1913–2008), American psychoanalyst 
 Claudia Brenner (born 1956), American activist
 David Brenner (1936–2014), American comedian
 David S. Brenner (1962–2022), American film editor
 Eduard Brenner (1888–1970), German politician and anglicist
 Engelbert Brenner (1904–1986), Austrian-American musician
 Ernst Brenner (1856–1911), Swiss politician
 Eve Brenner (born 1925), American actress
 Ève Brenner (born 1941), French soprano
 George Brenner, American cartoonist
 Guillaume Brenner (born 1986), French-born Togolese footballer
 Helmut Brenner (born 1957), Austrian ethnomusicologist
 Hoby Brenner (born 1959), American football player
 Jacob Brenner (1857–1921), American lawyer and judge
 Jeffrey Brenner, American CEO of the Jewish Board of Family and Children's Services
 John Brenner (disambiguation), several people
 Johnny Brenner (born 1971), Irish hurler
 Joshua Ilika Brenner (born 1976), Mexican swimmer
 József Brenner, better known under his pen name Géza Csáth (1887–1919), Hungarian writer
 Kehoma Brenner (born 1986), German rugby union player
 Lenni Brenner (born 1937), American activist
 Lisa Brenner (born 1974), American actress
 Ludwig von Brenner (1833–1902), German composer
 Malcolm Brenner, British scientist
 Marie Brenner, American writer
 Marie Pauline Brenner, American Catholic educator
 Mark Brenner, American journalist
 Moshe Brener (born 1971), Israeli basketball player
 Paolo Brenner (born 1966), German cardiac surgeon
 Reeve Robert Brenner (born 1936), American rabbi
 Reuven Brenner, Canadian resident economist
 Robert Brenner, American historian
 Sophia Elisabet Brenner (1659–1730), Swedish writer
 Sydney Brenner, (1927–2019), South African biologist
 Veronica Brenner (born 1974), Canadian skier
 Victor David Brenner (1871–1924), American sculptor and designer of the Lincoln Wheat Ears Cent
 Vytas Brenner (1946–2004), Venezuelan musician
 Yosef Haim Brenner (1881–1921), Ukrainian-born Hebrew-language author
 Walter Brenner (disambiguation), several people 
 Zev Brenner, American talk radio host
 Zvi Brenner (1915–1999), Israeli military leader

Fictional characters include:
 Zeke Brenner, in the comic strip Doonesbury
 Dr. Martin Brenner, in the American television series Stranger Things
 Joseph P. Brenner, in the 1986 film Raw Deal
 Brenner, in the video game Advance Wars: Days of Ruin

See also
 Brener
 Brynner (disambiguation)

German-language surnames
Jewish surnames